Staining is a local discoloration.

Staining may refer to one of the following.

Staining, dyeing of organic matter in the laboratory
Wood staining, a wood treatment
Staining, Lancashire, a village in Lancashire
All Hallows Staining a former church in the City of London

See also
Stain (disambiguation)